Brian Swatuk (9 July 1949 – 13 December 2014) was a Canadian jockey in Thoroughbred horse racing. He won several Canadian classics, most notably the Queen's Plate in 1979, and the Prince of Wales Stakes in 1987. Swatuk died from cancer on 13 December 2014 in an Ontario hospice. He was 65.

References

1949 births
2014 deaths
Canadian jockeys
Deaths from cancer in Ontario
Sportspeople from Toronto